Sibir is a rural locality (a settlement) in Novoyegoryevsky Selsoviet, Yegoryevsky District, Altai Krai, Russia. The population was 18 as of 2013.

Geography 
Sibir is located 23 km southeast of Novoyegoryevskoye (the district's administrative centre) by road. Peschany Borok is the nearest rural locality.

References 

Rural localities in Yegoryevsky District, Altai Krai